Chaudhry Shujaat Hussain ((born 27 January 1940) is a senior Pakistani politician from a Punjabi Jat family of Gujrat who previously served as 16th prime minister of Pakistan. Hussain is the party president of the Pakistan Muslim League (Q) since 2003
.

Hailing from the business-industrialist family from the Punjab Province of Pakistan, Hussain graduated from the FC College University and the Punjab University. After his graduation, Hussain subsequently joined the family business comprising large numbers of industries, textiles, agricultural farms, sugar and flour mills. He successfully contested in the non-partisan 1985 elections and was appointed as minister of industry in the government of Prime minister Muhammad Junejo, lasting until 1988. Hussain became a leader and influential conservative figure in the Islamic Democratic Alliance (IDA) between 1988 and 1990 and joined the Pakistan Muslim League (PML) under Nawaz Sharif in 1993. Hussain served as the 26th Interior minister in the government of Prime minister Nawaz Sharif in two non-consecutive terms from 1990 to 1993 and 1997 to 1999.

Originally a loyalist of Nawaz Sharif, Hussain defected to autocratic leader Pervez Musharraf after 1999 and became member of the new PML-Q. His family remains influential in national politics and his younger cousin Pervez Illahi served as Chief Minister of Punjab from 2002 to 2007 during Musharraf's military rule. Following the 2008 elections and Musharraf's resignation, Hussain and his party became a major ally of Prime minister Yousaf Raza Gillani and President Asif Ali Zardari from the Pakistan Peoples Party.

Origins and education
Chaudhry Shujaat Hussain was born on 27 January 1940 in the Gujrat District, Punjab, of former British Indian Empire. He was born in a Punjabi Jat family belonging to Warraich clan. His ancestors hailing from rural Gujrat and had no initial political background. His father, Zahoor Elahi was a junior constable in Punjab Police but quit the police service to establish a cotton mill. His family lost a cotton mill as a result of Indian partition but re-established the mill in Gujrat after the establishment of Pakistan in 1947. His father first contested in 1954 elections and elected a local union Councillor of the Gujrat District. After attending public schools in Gujrat, Hussain matriculated, and was accepted at the Forman Christian College University. In 1962, Hussain attended the Forman Christian College University and graduated with Bachelor of Business Administration in 1965 and pursued an MA in Industrial management in UK.

Upon returning to Pakistan, Hussain joined the family industrial conglomerate comprising industrial units in textiles, sugar, flour milling and agricultural farms in 1969. By this time, Hussain's family had become a potent industrial oligarchs and had significant influence on presidents Ayub Khan and General Yahya Khan.

Career in national politics
Chaudhry Shujaat Hussain entered in the national politics after the assassination of his father. After participating in a local-body elections, Hussain became a Member of the Parliament in 1981 and, subsequently joining the Punjab government's Financial department. He participated and campaign successfully in non-partisan 1985 general elections and maintains ties with PML. His contest in the general election from Gujrat included for both seats for the National Assembly and provincial Punjab Assembly. After the elections he vacated his Punjab Assembly seat in favour of the National Assembly seat.

He became a crucial power broker in the Islamist regime Zia-ul-Haq. Hussain benefited with general Zia's economic policies. Hussain invested in industrial firms and mills. Bought Stocks at Karachi Stock Exchange, which benefited him.

After participating in 1985 general elections, Hussain joined the government of Prime Minister Muhammad Khan Junejo as the minister of the Ministry of Industry, and held additional ministerial portfolio of Ministry of Information and Mass-media Broadcasting in 1986; and Ministry of Defence Production in 1987–88.

He was imprisoned during second tenure of Bhutto in 1994 in politically-motivated cases filed by Federal Investigation Agency DG Rehman Malik.

Interior ministry
Hussain was the leading member of right-wing alliance, the Islamic Democratic Alliance (IDA) and won parliamentary seat during 1988 general elections, and headed the Parliamentary Party of Joint Opposition (PPJO) in the National Assembly from 1988 to 1990. He also acted as the parliamentary party leader of the Pakistan Muslim League (N) (PML-N) in the National Assembly.

After 1990 elections and 1997 elections, Chaudhry Shujaat served as Interior ministry. He was one of high-profile cabinet member of Prime minister Nawaz Sharif who appointed Shujaat as the President of the PML-N in Punjab from 1997 to 1999 However, Hussain mounted serious disagreement and confronted Nawaz Sharif after Sharif imposing economic emergency in 1998. Hussain's relations became extremely hostile during the Kargil war and claiming that Sharif had been briefed by chief of army staff general Pervez Musharraf six times as opposed to Sharif claiming not having "knowledge".

Pakistan Muslim League
After the coup, Hussain did not join the Pakistan Muslim League, a splinter group of PML. In 2001, Hussain decided to defect to PML after Sharif was exiled to Saudi Arabia in 2000 and contested from Gujrat through the PML platform during the 2002 general elections. Initially, Hussain became parliamentary party leader in the National Assembly, but assumed the presidency of the party when the party's founder Mian Muhammad Azhar resigned from the party. In January 2003, Shujaat was nominated and assumed the party's presidency after succeeding Mian Muhammad Azhar on a party convention.

Prime Minister of Pakistan
Chaudhry Shujaat Hussain endorsed and provided his support to appoint his lifelong friend Zafarullah Khan Jamali as country's first Baloch prime minister. Previously, he also played a role in bringing Shaukat Aziz in national politics. However, in 2004 Jamali resigned.

After Jamali's resignation, Shujaat Husain nominated Finance Minister Shaukat Aziz for the office of Prime Minister. Shujaat temporarily become Prime Minister because Aziz can not be elected Prime Minister, as he was a member of senate.

At the Parliament, Hussain told journalists that his election as Prime Minister was "not an interim appointment" but in keeping with the Constitution. In an interview, Shujaat Hussain quoted: "My nomination by Mir Zafarullah Khan Jamali and nomination of Shaukat Aziz after consulting the President were in line with the set traditions. There should be no hue and cry over such technicalities."

On 23 August 2004, Hussain handed over the office of prime minister to Shaukat Aziz, though Hussain remained the party president of the Pakistan Muslim League (Q).

Election as Prime Minister
The election for Prime Minister took place on 29 June 2004.

Personal life
Chaudhry Shujaat Hussain is the eldest son of Chaudhry Zahoor Ilahi. His elder cousin, Chaudhry Pervaiz Elahi, current chief minister of Punjab and also held the post of Deputy Prime Minister in Pakistan Peoples Party's recent government. His younger brother, Chaudhry Wajahat Hussain, has also been elected to the Provincial Assembly of the Punjab for three times (1988–1990,1990–1993,1997–1999) and also won from the constituency NA-104 of National Assembly in 2002 and 2008 general elections. Wajahat Force of PML-Q, MNA; and Chaudhry Wajahat Husain, is linked to numerous scams of Hawala and Money laundering, and have wreaked havoc on the local populace.

Honors
Hussain had been a strong and vocal supporter of Pakistan's bilateral relations with South Korea. He helped in bringing South Korea investment in the country and supports South-Korean model of economy in the country. For his efforts, the South Korean government named him "Honorary Consul General" of Republic of Korea. Hussain is also a recipient of South Korea's highest diplomatic award Order of the Diplomatic Service Merit "Ueung-in-Metal" for distinguished services in promoting mutual relations between Pakistan and Republic of Korea.

Wealth and personal assets

Chaudhry Shujaat Hussain is one of the powerful business personalities in Pakistan. Hussain is investor in defence production, military technological development, and industrial mills. According to the statements of assets and liabilities for 2010–2011, 50% of Hussain's share in two residential houses located in Islamabad and Lahore worth ₨. 9.2million and ₨.3.4 million, respectively (although he did not issued the current value). Hussain also owns a 78-acre of agricultural land worth ₨. 376,667 and 12.5 acres worth ₨. 4.5 million. He has stock shares worth ₨. 10.4 million and ₨. 53.90 million cash in his account.

See also
Chaudhry Zahoor Elahi
Chaudhry Salik Hussain

References

External links
 Some facts of Ch Shujaat hussain None
 Story Of Pakistan Profile
 Official Website of Pakistan Muslim League

|-

|-

|-

Living people
1946 births
Chaudhry family
Forman Christian College alumni
Interior ministers of Pakistan
Pakistan Muslim League (Q) MNAs
Pakistani industrialists
Politicians from Gujrat, Pakistan
Prime Ministers of Pakistan
Pakistani prisoners and detainees
Pakistani MNAs 1990–1993
Pakistani MNAs 1997–1999
Pakistani MNAs 2002–2007
Pakistan Muslim League (N) MNAs
Pakistani MNAs 2008–2013
People from Gujrat District
Punjabi people
Minister of Railways (Pakistan)